Glenwood is a city in Pike and Montgomery counties in Arkansas, United States. As of the 2020 census, its population was 2,068. The community is located along the Caddo River in the Ouachita Mountains.

Glenwood was formed as a boomtown following the development of the Gurdon and Fort Smith Railroad and timber interests in the area. After the establishment of a lumber mill, the community received a post office and incorporated in April 1909. Although the community saw its major employer leave during the Great Depression, the city has again seen rapid growth in recent decades. The city also sees significant tourism related to its scenic position in the Ouachitas and among several recreational lakes.

Geography
Glenwood is located in the northeast corner of Pike County at  (34.328029, -93.548412). Four small portions of the city extend north into Montgomery County. U.S. Route 70 passes through the city south of its center; it leads northeast  to Hot Springs and southwest  to De Queen. Arkansas Highway 8 passes through the city center, leading northwest  to Norman and southeast  to Arkadelphia.

The Caddo River passes through the west side of the city, flowing southeast to join the Ouachita River north of Arkadelphia.

Demographics

2020 census

As of the 2020 United States census, there were 2,068 people, 843 households, and 534 families residing in the city.

2000 census
At the 2000 census, there were 1,751 people, 696 households and 446 families residing in the city. The racial makeup of the city was 88.18% White, 1.03% Black or African American, 1.03% Native American, 0.17% Asian, 8.79% from other races, and 0.80% from two or more races. 11.31% of the population were Hispanic or Latino of any race.

There were 696 households, of which 29.3% had children under the age of 18 living with them, 47.0% were married couples living together, 12.8% had a female householder with no husband present, and 35.9% were non-families. 32.3% of all households were made up of individuals, and 18.2% had someone living alone who was 65 years of age or older. The average household size was 2.37 and the average family size was 2.97.

23.3% of the population were under the age of 18, 10.0% from 18 to 24, 22.0% from 25 to 44, 20.0% from 45 to 64, and 24.7% who were 65 years of age or older. The median age was 41 years. For every 100 females, there were 85.5 males. For every 100 females age 18 and over, there were 81.7 males.

The median household income was $24,740 and the median family income was $32,829. Males had a median income of $26,528 compared with $16,354 for females. The per capita income for the city was $14,137. About 17.2% of families and 22.1% of the population were below the poverty line, including 28.3% of those under age 18 and 19.6% of those age 65 or over.

Economy
The largest businesses/employers in Glenwood include John Plyler Home Center, Wright's Food Center, Shelby Manufacturing, Caddo River Forest Products, and the Centerpoint School District.

Arts and culture

Annual cultural events
The Pike County Fairgrounds is the site for the Pike County Fair each September. The fair kicks off with a parade. Youngsters from around the county compete in beauty pageants, talent shows, and animal exhibits. The fair has a carnival and rodeo.

The annual Caddo River Festival is sponsored by the Glenwood Regional Chamber of Commerce the last weekend in April in the downtown area. The festival incorporates a parade, local talent, various vendors and food trucks, antique car and tractor shows, 5K race, and the premier attraction: canoe races (Canoes are on wheels and pushed up the main street).

Tourism
Glenwood is the site of Billy's House of Guitars and Musical Museum, which includes instruments and memorabilia from notable guitarists such as Johnny Cash, Bob Dylan, George Harrison, Elvis Presley and Pete Seeger. The museum is located on Broadway Street (U.S. Route 70B) in downtown Glenwood. The Glenwood Country Club is located on US 70 east of town. An 18-hole public course with lodging and restaurant, the facility is listed on the Natural State Golf Trail, a collection of twelve elite courses in unique locations across the state.

The city also sees significant tourism associated with the region's natural attractions. Canoeing and fishing are available on the Caddo River, which flows through the city before widening into DeGray Lake. The Little Missouri Falls area is a day-use area featuring picnic areas with grills, a hiking trail, and scenic overlook. Crater of Diamonds State Park, DeGray Lake Resort State Park, Lake Greeson and Lake Ouachita are also nearby, offering further recreational opportunities to residents and visitors.

Education
Public education for elementary and secondary school students in almost all of the municipality (almost all of the portion in Pike County) is provided by Centerpoint School District. Area students graduate from Centerpoint High School.

The Amity School District merged with the Glenwood School District to form the Centerpoint district on July 1, 1995.

A small sliver within Montgomery County is in the Caddo Hills School District, which graduates students via Caddo Hills High School.

A small sliver in Pike County is in the Kirby School District, which graduates students through Kirby High School.

Media
Glenwood is served by two main rural media outlets: the Glenwood Herald newspaper and KHGZ radio.

Notable person
 Clark Duke, comedian, actor, and director

See also

 List of cities and towns in Arkansas

References

External links

Cities in Pike County, Arkansas
Cities in Montgomery County, Arkansas
Populated places established in 1909
Cities in Arkansas